Los MVP's is the debut album by Angel & Khriz. The album is best known for containing the hit Ven Baílalo. Los MVP's was re-released shortly after the release of MVP 2. It replaced track 12 (Dile Que No) with a new track entitled Fua! from MVP 2 and had a slightly different track order than the original.  The album is famous for including the worldwide hit "Ven Bailalo" often considered one of the most famous reggaeton songs in history peaking at #3 on the Billboard Latin charts. 
 The album was well received internationally, receiving a platinum certification from the RIAA for shipping 100,000 copies in the United States.

Track listing

Special Edition

Charts

Sales and certifications

References

2005 debut albums
Angel & Khriz albums
Albums produced by Luny Tunes
Albums produced by Noriega
Albums produced by Nely